is 1of 2 essays from a Japanese nursery rhyme written in 1922 by Japanese poet Ujō Noguchi, and composed by Nagayo Motoori.

Lyrics 

There is evidence that in the original manuscript the line read "Every time I see red shoes, I remember her" but was changed to "think of".

Originally unreleased, a fifth stanza was discovered in notes released in 1978.

Established origin theory 
The established theory is that the lyrics were written based on a true story. It is believed that a young girl from Fushimi, Shizuoka Prefecture named Iwasaki Kimi (July 15, 1902 - September 15, 1911), was the model for the girl wearing red shoes.

Kimi's mother, Kayo Iwasaki was raising her as a single mother, but eventually moved to Hokkaido and married Shirou Suzuki. When Kimi was 3 her parents joined a commoner's farm in Hokkaido that at the time was being watched as a part of the Socialist movement.  However the farming life was harsh so using her father-in-law, Sano Yasuyoshi, as a medium Kayo entrusted Kimi's upbringing to a pair of married American missionaries by the name of Hewitt.

In time the Hewitt's decided to return home to America, but Kimi contracted Tuberculosis (incurable at the time) and they were unable to take her to America with them as a result. Instead they entrusted her to the orphanage at Toriikazu Church in Azabu, Tokyo and returned without her. Unable to meet her mother again, Kimi died at the orphanage at age 9. Kayo went her entire life thinking Kimi had gone to America with the Hewitts, not knowing that she had in fact died of TB at an orphanage in Tokyo.

In 1907, Ujou Noguchi, who was published as a socialist poet in 1903, became close to Suzuki Shirou, a co-worker at the newspaper he worked for in Sapporo, and his wife Kayo. He then heard the story of how Kimi had been taken to America by missionaries from Kayo. Having a new suckling child, the Suzuki's had become discouraged with the farming lifestyle. At this same time Kimi was at the orphanage in Tokyo, but Kayo was unaware of this. Later in 1921, Noguchi wrote "Akai Kutsu" based on the story and in 1922 it became a nursery rhyme using Motoori's composition.

In 1973 Kimi's half-sister, Sono (Shirou and Kayo's third daughter), wrote to the newspaper stating that "My sister is the girl from "Akai Kutsu". Upon seeing this a reporter for Hokkaido Television Broadcasting, Hiroshi Kikuchi, became interested and started investigating. After 5 years of fact gathering Kikuchi was able to confirm the story and in 1978 a documentary entitled "Document: The Girl in the Red Shoes" aired on HKB. After that Kikuchi released a non-fiction book titled "The Girl in The Red Shoes". This book's account of the story became the established theory on the matter.

Arguments against the established theory 
The idea that this established theory is partially based on fabrications was advocated by the author Shousuke Ai. When the "Mother and Child Statue" was erected in Nihondaira in Shizuoka in 1986, Ai was asked to write a script for a commemorative special by the local TV station, SBS, entitled "The Wandering Poem: The Girl in the Red Shoes." However, at this time Ai was harbouring doubts about the truth behind the established theory that had been presented in Kikuchi's book and "Document: The Girl in the Red Shoes" and decided to investigate the contradictions in the theory. In his book "Hoax: The Unworn Red Shoes" Ai clarified his position of the established theory having no basis.

Ai's theory is as follows:
The statement in Kikuchi's book that Sano was Kimi's real father has no basis. It's best to think that Kimi being in the family register as Sano's adopted daughter was just a step taken to allow an illegitimate child to be put in her grandfather's family register. 
The name of the missionaries, identified as Kimi's adoptive parents in Kikuchi's book, Hewitt is correct, but the Hewitts never had any contact with Kimi. "The story of Kimi being entrusted to the missionary couple was just a lie Sano told to comfort Kayo. In reality, Sano gave her directly to the orphanage in Tokyo and she lived out her life there. During that time, the Hewitts were in Hokkaido doing missionary work and therefore could not have adopted Kimi who never came to Hokkaido.
Kikuchi's book says that "Ujou, who had heard the story from Kayo about Kimi being adopted, turned the story into a poem", but Kayo did not have many occasions to meet and talk with the Noguchis, and would not have been likely to discuss the illegitimate child she had before marriage. The relationship between the Noguchis and Suzukis probably never exceeded the men associating as co-workers and discussions about socialism.
Ujou's "Akai Kutsu" should be seen as a metaphor for the frustrations of the Utopian Socialist movement.

Ai argues that Kikuchi filled the holes in his research with his imagination, but Kikuchi insists there are no errors in the basis of his theory.

Ai also insists that, based on Noguchi Nobuya's (Ujou's son) research, "Ujou's nursery rhymes, of which "Akai Kutsu" is included, are not about any particular person." On the other hand, Kukichi states that "Akai Kutsu" and some of Ujou's other works are in fact referring to particular people. The two are even in disagreement about the interpretation of "Shabondama" in which the line "So soon after it was born, it broke and was no more" may express Ujou's sorrow over the premature death of his eldest daughter

The two are in complete agreement on the fact that Kayo honestly spent her life believing Kimi had been adopted by missionaries and gone to America. However, the two and their supporters disagree on whether those missionaries were the real-life Hewitts (Kikuchi's theory) or if they were just fabrications created by Sano (Ai's theory). Ai says that "Kikuchi is damaging the good name of the Hewitts, who never even met Kimi, with his fictional story that he created for a TV program."

Furthermore, Ai is trying to substantiate his theory that Ujou's "Akai Kutsu" is not about Kimi while at the same time criticizing that the story of Ujou writing the poem after hearing from Kayo about Kimi's adoption is "just a further embellishment of the boasting based on Kayo's bad assumption, by Kikuchi and Sono." However it is a fact that Kayo told Sono that "Ujou-san wrote a poem about Kimi." For that reason it is impossible to reject the interpretation from Kayo. Because the theories about Ujou, Kayo's interpretation, and the validity of Kikuchi's data collection process are a disorganized mess of debate, no consensus has been reached.

In order to refute Kikuchi's book and Sono's statement that "Kayo spoke to the Noguchi's about Kimi," Ai is performing a thorough investigation into his own theory that "Kayo didn't have many opportunities to talk to the Noguchi's and wasn't close enough with them to speak of such things." On the other hand, because the two sides aren't in disagreement about the possibility that the Suzuki's could have told Ujou about Kimi or that Ujou may have researched the Suzuki family, an investigation of whether Ujou could have known about Kimi would be insufficient.

On August 21, 2009, the statue "Kimi-chan" was erected in Hakodate, Hokkaido based on the established theory. However, a newspaper article about the statue's erection pointed out that there are many theories about "Akai Kutsu." Mainichi Shimbun reported that "There are indications that it was written about the setbacks of the Utopian Socialist movement that was based around Shūsui Kōtoku who had led the development of peasant farming, and relatives of Noguchi assert that "there was no real-life model (for the girl in the song).""

Currently the debate on whether or not the Noguchi's relationship with the Suzuki's, who had suffered setbacks in the peasant farming movement, had an effect on Ujou's poems (including "Akai Kutsu") is not making progress.

Furthermore, even Ujou's relatives are split on whether his nursery rhymes are about particular people or not. Ujou's granddaughter, Fujiko, as representative of the Ujou Noguchi Memorial Hall, stated in a speech that "Shabondama" expresses his sorrow over the premature death of his daughter. Nobuya and Fujiko also differ on their stance towards the official theory; Nobuya consistently opposes it while Fujiko made a commemorative speech at the celebration of the completion of the "Kimi-chan" statue.

However, Nobuya also thinks that Mokichi Noguchi (Ujou's younger cousin), who was a devoted follower of Sen Katayama's theory on Socialism, had a huge effect on Ujou's early poems that weren't nursery rhymes.

In her recent work "A Poet of Nostalgia and a Childlike Heart: The Ujou Noguchi Story" Fujiko Noguchi writes that it's natural to think that the fourth stanza in "Akai Kutsu" is about Mokichi (who left for America from Yokohama in 1905 and died in Los Angeles in 1954). In regards to the established theory she writes that while there is no evidence, it is adequate to think that some personal experience of Ujou's became the basis for "Akai Kutsu." Fujiko doesn't touch on Ai's theory in the book.

Other debates 
Even before the publishing of "Hoax: The Unworn Red Shoes", differing opinions on the interpretation of this rhyme were an issue. In 2003 on NHK Educational TV's educational program "A Course About Humans" in a series titled "Why Do People Sing?", Rokusuke Ei stated that he heard from Fujiko Noguchi that "The Aka (red) in "Akai Kutsu" ("Red Shoes") is a reference to the Soviet Union, and that Ujou was saying "where has the Soviet Union and Socialism gone?", but in order to avoid censorship under the Peace Preservation Law law he used a metaphor."

However, in an article in the June 17, 2003 issue of "Weekly Shinchou" Fujiko Noguchi refuted this claim saying "I never spoke to Ei about Ujou's nursery rhymes." There is now a rift between her and Ei who insists he heard it from her. In the same article there are also comments from Hiroshi Eguchi pointing out Ei's misunderstanding saying "the Peace Preservation Law wasn't established until years after the release of "Akai Kutsu"", and composer Koichi Sugiyama criticizing Ei by saying "He is misinterpreting Ujou's masterpiece as something anti-Japanese."

Also in the article, former chairman of the Ujou Council and Ujou researcher Masako Saijou refers to the established theory of Ujou basing the poem off a story he heard from Suzuki Shirou and expresses doubt over Ei's interpretation of the red as representative of the Soviet Union.

In the conclusion the reporter quotes uses Ujou's own words, "it is not acceptable to critique a nursery rhyme's lyrics using logic," to disregard Rokosuke Ei who is just trying to escape into the idea that "no matter the author's feelings a song is something that is influenced by the ideas of those that come after."

The article does not mention the fact that Ujou was published as a Socialist poet or that Shirou Suzuki was involved in peasant farming. There is also no discussion on the debate of whether Ujou's later change in literary style was due to him seriously doing an about-face on Socialism, or if his change was just a disguise and his Socialist roots remained.

In December, 2009 guest Tomoko Matsushima introduced the established theory on TBS Radio's .

Statues 

In 1979 in Yamashita Park in Yokohama the statue "The Girl in the Red Shoes" was erected. Based on the more innocent imagery of Ujou's poem, this statue was a gift from the Council of Citizens who Love Akai Kutsu (later renamed the Akai Kutsu Commemoration Cultural Foundation.) In 1982 the Council also donated a miniature version of the statue to Yokohama Station. Originally the statue was placed at the south entrance, but in December, 2010 it was moved to free passage.

In 2009, a replica of the statue in Yamashita Park was erected in Yokohama's sister city of San Diego, California near the beach, and was unveiled on June 27.

The following 6 statues were erected based on the aforementioned established theory.。
 Shizuoka Prefecture, Nihondaira "Mother and Daughter Statue" （1986）
 Tokyo, Azabu-Juuban "Statue of Kimi-chan" （1989）
 Hokkaido, Rusutsu "Mother's Feelings" （1991）
 Hokkaido, Otaru "Akai Kutsu: Parents and Child Statue" （2007）
 Hokkaido, Hakodate "Statue of Kimi-chan" （2009）
 Aomori Prefecture, Ajigasawa "Akai Kutsu Statue" （2010）

On September 4, 2012 on NHK Radio 2's show "Basic English 3", guest Dario Toda said that a statue is currently being sculpted with his sister as the model.

In popular culture 

The word foreigner (いじんさん) in the song was commonly used from the time of the Bakumatsu through the Meiji period to refer to someone from a foreign country (外国人）, as opposed to someone from a different domain within the country. Because of the "blue-eyed" lyric it is indicating Westerners. It does not say "great man" (偉人さん）, "Mr. Carrot" (にんじんさん）, "good uncle" （いい爺さん）, "great grandfather" (曾爺). Manga artist Momoko Sakura, from Shimizu, wrote the shōjo manga "Chibi Maruko-chan" based on this idea.

In the popular Japanese anime "Ghost in the Shell" a version of Akai Kutsu is sung by the Tachkoma in S1E16. "Pretty little girl, red shoes she wore. Now I understand. She and her red shoes taken far away by a foreign man."

Even before his book, "The Wandering Poem: The Girl in the Red Shoes", Shousuke Ai wrote a television script based on "Akai Kutsu" under his real name Bunbei Ai. The 45th episode of Ultraman Taro, entitled "From A Japanese Nursery Rhyme: Wearing Red Shoes..." (1974), is about a young girl who was taken away by aliens when she was little and turned into a monster to help invade Earth, and her childhood friend who is a member of the Self-Defense Forces. (1984), depicts the interactions between Katsuhiko Yokomitsu, a detective in disguise on a special mission, and a young girl. In one scene Yokomitsu sings "Akai Kutsu". The Akai Kutsu Committee (later renamed the Japan Akai Kutsu Committee), that was established for the sake of the movement against the established theory, has Ai as chairman and Yokomitsu as an honorary adviser, but Yokomitsu is participating more as a "former actor turned politician."

The movie "Superior Ultraman 8 Brothers" (2008) was made in anticipation of the 150th anniversary of the opening of the Port of Yokohama. The statue in Yamashita Park is also featured in the film. The "Akai Kutsu Girl", who seems like a normal human at first, plays a being who transcends time and space and guides Ultraman. However her true form is unclear.

In the 2007 drama "Gluttonous Detectives 2", in an episode entitled , the circumstances of a man who was taken from his Japanese mother and went abroad overlap with the song. It was also filmed in Yamashita Park.

At the Yokohama Carnival that takes place in summer a big dance event known as the Hamakoi Odori (a dance originating from Yosakoi) is held. One of the rules of the dance is that the nursery rhyme "Akai Kutsu" must be included among the tunes.

References

External links 

 The lyrics in romaji, with English translation, as well as a performance of the song
 Wikimapia article regarding one of the sculptures in Yokohama
 The "Akai Kutsu" Story – various works about "Akai Kutsu" 
 「A Guide to Azabu-Juuban」･･･Various things about the "Kimi-chan Statue" in Azabu-Juuban. 
 The girl in the red shoes didn't go to the foreigner's country!?  
 Japan Akai Kutsu Committee – the model for "Akai Kutsu" wasn't Kimi-chan 

1922 compositions
Japanese poems
Japanese songs
Japanese children's songs
Japanese nursery rhymes